Chidiock Paulet (by 1521 – 17 August 1574) was an English politician and Captain of Portsmouth. He was born the third son of William Paulet, 1st Marquess of Winchester and educated at the Inner Temple.

He was Esquire of the Stable by 1545, Receiver at the Court of Augmentations for Gloucestershire, Hampshire and  Wiltshire by 1550–1554, and at the Exchequer from 1554 to his death. He was Captain of  Portsmouth from May 1554 – 1559 and treasurer of the Bishop of Winchester from 1566 until his death.

He was returned as a Member (MP) of the Parliament of England for Bramber in 1547, and for Gatton in October 1553.

Death

He died in 1574. He had married twice: firstly Elizabeth, the daughter of Sir Thomas White of South Warnborough, Hampshire, with whom he had 1 son and 3 daughters and secondly Frances, the daughter of Sir Edward Neville of Aldington, Kent and widow of Sir Edward Waldegrave of Borley, Essex, with whom he had another son.

See also
 List of Governors of Portsmouth

References

1521 births
1574 deaths
Members of the Inner Temple
English MPs 1547–1552
English MPs 1553 (Mary I)
Chidiock
Younger sons of marquesses